A sailor is part of a crew on a ship or boat.

Sailor may also refer to:

Entertainment
Sailor (album), a 1968 album by the Steve Miller Band
Sailor (band), a British pop group which peaked in the mid-1970s
Sailor (TV series), a 1970s BBC television series
"Sailor (Your Home is the Sea)", a 1960 German-language song by Lolita
"Sailor" (song), the English-language rendering by Petula Clark 
The Sailor (Mickey Newbury album), 1979
The Sailor (Rich Brian album), 2019
Sailor, a song by the Brian Jonestown Massacre on the 2001 album Bravery, Repetition and Noise
Sailor Steve Costigan, a fictional character created by Robert E. Howard, in an eponymous series of stories
The Sailor, a 1935 Arabic film by Togo Mizrahi

People
Sailor (surname)

Nickname
Sailor Brown (1915–2008), English footballer
Jimmy Herbert (1897–1968), Canadian National Hockey League player
John Hunter (footballer, born 1878) (1878–1966), Scottish football player and manager
Sailor Malan (1910–1963), South African Second World War RAF fighter ace
Sailor Roberts (1931–1995), American poker player
Sailor Stroud (1885–1970), American Major League Baseball pitcher
Sailor Young (1876–1964), English cricketer

Ring name
Sailor Burke, ring name of American boxer Charles Presser (1885–1960)
Sailor Art Thomas (1924–2003), American bodybuilder and professional wrestler
Sailor White (also Moondog King), ring name of Canadian professional wrestler Edward White (1949–2005)

Horses
Sailor (horse) (1817–1820), an American Thoroughbred racehorse
Sailor II (foaled 1952), an American Thoroughbred racehorse

Other uses
Sailor Creek, Idaho, a tributary of the Snake River
Sailors Run, a stream in Ohio
Sailor hat, a type of wide-brimmed, flat-crowned straw hat
Sailor sandwich, a sandwich popular in Richmond, Virginia
Sailor, in brickwork terminology, a brick laid vertically on its end with the largest, broad face exposed 
Sailor, a computer network operated by Enoch Pratt Free Library on behalf of the public libraries in the State of Maryland
Sailor, a fictional toy character in the Wee Sing 1988 video: Grandpa's Magical Toys

See also
List of Sailor Moon characters, various fictional characters whose names begin with "Sailor", including principal protagonist Sailor Moon
Sailer (disambiguation)
Sailors (disambiguation)
Saylor

Lists of people by nickname